Colonia Polana is a village and municipality in Misiones Province in north-eastern Argentina founded in 1900 by English immigrants.

References

Populated places in Misiones Province